The 1994 Samoa rugby union tour of Australia was a series of five matches played by Samoa in Australia during July and August 1994. 

Samoa won the first four matches against Victoria, ACT, Queensland and a New South Wales XV, but lost the Test against Australia in the final match of the tour in Sydney.

The Samoan team had played 17 games for the year by that stage. The tour followed closely after the Pacific Tri-Nations and Super 10 tournaments, which included matches in New Zealand, South Africa, Fiji, and Australia.

Results

Week 1

Week 2

References

1994 rugby union tours
1994
1994 in Australian rugby union
1994
1994 in Oceanian rugby union
rugby union